Bolyarino is a village in Southern Bulgaria. It is located in Rakovski Municipality, Plovdiv Province.

Geography 
Bolyarino is located in Rakovski Municipality, Plovdiv Province on 35 km. east from Plovdiv. It lies between two elongated hills (height: 213 m). The soil in the northwest parts is sandy, as the rest is Chernozem. The elevation is 167 m.

Natural and cultural monuments 
The forest situated between Shishmantsi and Bolyarino is declared as protected territory, in order to preserve the location of very rare birds, such as little egret, squacco heron, black-crowned night heron, glossy ibis.

Annual events 
The village festival is on Dimitrovden – 26 October.

External links 
 http://rakovski.bg/page.php?9

Villages in Plovdiv Province